Slobodan Tedić (born 13 April 2000) is a Serbian footballer who plays as a striker for EFL League One club Barnsley, on loan from Manchester City.

Career

Club career
Born in Podgorica, Yugoslavia, Tedić debuted in the Serbian SuperLiga with FK Čukarički in the 2017–18 season.

In September 2019, a deal was agreed for Tedić to join Manchester City in January 2020. He remained on loan at his former club until the end of the 2019–20 season. 

On 1 September 2020, Tedić joined Eredivisie side PEC Zwolle on a season-long loan deal. On 28 May 2021, the loan had been extended.

On 4 August 2022, Tedić signed for EFL League One club Barnsley on loan for the 2022–23 season.

References

External links

2000 births
Living people
Footballers from Podgorica
Serbian footballers
Serbia youth international footballers
Montenegrin footballers
Serbian expatriate footballers
Association football midfielders
FK Vojvodina players
FK Čukarički players
Manchester City F.C. players
PEC Zwolle players
Barnsley F.C. players
Serbian SuperLiga players
Eredivisie players
Serbia under-21 international footballers
Serbian expatriate sportspeople in England
Serbian expatriate sportspeople in the Netherlands
Expatriate footballers in England
Expatriate footballers in the Netherlands